The Heiresses is a 2018 Paraguayan drama film directed by Marcelo Martinessi. Set in contemporary Asunción, it tells the story of two women who have lived together for 30 years in an inherited house but are running out of money. When one is imprisoned for attempted fraud, the other has to readjust her life. Selected to compete for the Golden Bear at the 68th Berlin International Film Festival, the leading actress Ana Brun won the Silver Bear for Best Actress and the director Marcelo Martinessi won the Silver Bear.

Plot
Chela and Chiquita have been a couple for over 30 years but their funds are running out. They start selling the furniture and Chela, fearing disgrace, refuses money from friends. When Chiquita gets notice to report to the city jail, charged with seeking a loan fraudulently, Chela is suddenly on her own. Telling people Chiquita has gone for a  stay by the sea, she carries on selling the house contents. Picuta, an elderly lady living close by, asks if Chela will drive her to visit friends who meet for cards and gossip. It was Chiquita who drove their venerable Mercedes, since Chela has no licence, but she obliges her neighbour, who forces cash on her to pay for the fuel. This develops into an informal taxi service for Picuta's friends.

On one of her trips meets the younger vivacious Angy, who begs her to drive out on the motorway to Itauguá, where her mother is being treated. Though Chela has never been on a motorway, she makes the effort. Angy takes an interest in the lonely older woman, telling her stories of her very varied love life. But the friendship takes a chill when Angy jumps out of the car to join a passing boyfriend. Chela also worries that Chiquita in the women's prison is too interested in the other inmates.

Chauffeuring Picuta and some of her friends to a funeral, she meets Angy again and late that night the two go back to Chela's house to share a bottle of wine. When Angy offers herself, Chela hides in the toilet. Emerging later to find Angy gone, she boozily drives round the darkened city looking for her. A few days later Chiquita is released, but Chela is disoriented by the stresses she has been under and the sudden changes she has faced. In the morning Chiquita finds both Chela and the car missing.

Cast
 Ana Brun as Chela
 Margarita Irún as Chiquita
 Ana Ivanova as Angy
 María Martins as Pituca
 Alicia Guerra as Carmela
 Yverá Zayas as a Singer

Accolades
It was selected to compete for the Golden Bear in the main competition section at the 68th Berlin International Film Festival. At Berlin Ana Brun won the Silver Bear for Best Actress and Marcelo Martinessi won the Silver Bear 'Alfred Bauer' award to a film that 'opens new perspectives on cinematic art'. The film was also selected as the Paraguayan entry for the Best Foreign Language Film at the 91st Academy Awards, for the Best Iberoamerican Film at the 33rd Goya Awards, and for the Best Iberoamerican Film at the 61st Ariel Awards. It also won a Best Directing Award at the 2019 Premios Fenix  and received the Best Actress and Best First Film Awards at the 2019 Premios Platino.

Critical reception
On Metacritic, the film has a weighted average score of 77 out of 100, based on 12 critics, indicating "generally favorable reviews".

The website's critical consensus reads, "Led by a standout performance from Ana Brun, The Heiresses takes a thoroughly compelling look at lives little explored by mainstream cinema."

See also
 List of submissions to the 91st Academy Awards for Best Foreign Language Film
 List of Paraguayan submissions for the Academy Award for Best Foreign Language Film

References

External links
 

2018 films
2018 drama films
2010s Spanish-language films
Paraguayan LGBT-related films
LGBT-related drama films
2018 LGBT-related films
Paraguayan drama films